Črešnjice pri Cerkljah (in older sources also Češnjice) is a settlement north of Cerklje ob Krki in the Municipality of Brežice in eastern Slovenia. The area is part of the traditional region of Lower Carniola. It is now included with the rest of the municipality in the Lower Sava Statistical Region.

Name
The name of the settlement was changed from Črešnjice to Črešnjice pri Cerkljah in 1953. In the past the German name was Kerschdorf.

References

External links
Črešnjice pri Cerkljah on Geopedia

Populated places in the Municipality of Brežice